Aurora is a public artwork by American artist Mark di Suvero. It is in the collection of the National Gallery of Art and on display at the National Gallery of Art Sculpture Garden in Washington, D.C., United States.

Description 
Aurora consists of 8 tons of steel, resting on three diagonal supports.  Certain "linear elements converge within a central circular hub and then explode outward."

Information 
The name of the sculpture comes from a poem by Federico García Lorca about New York City.

Acquisition 
The sculpture is a gift from the Gift of Morris and Gwendolyn Cafritz Foundation.

Reception 
According to the National Gallery of Art the supports and steel "combine massive scale with elegance of proportion," and "imparting tension and dynamism." Michael Kimmelman of The New York Times called the work "pure compacted energy".

See also
 List of public art in Washington, D.C., Ward 2

References

External links
Mark di Suvero - Aurora, a video on YouTube of the artwork on display at the NGA

Outdoor sculptures in Washington, D.C.
1992 sculptures
Collections of the National Gallery of Art
Steel sculptures in Washington, D.C.
National Gallery of Art Sculpture Garden
Works by Mark di Suvero